Koh-Lanta: La Guerre des Chefs was the 20th season of the French reality game show from the popular television series, Koh-Lanta. The season premiered in France on TF1 on 15 March 2019, and concluded on 21 June 2019. The season was produced by Adventure Line Productions. Filming for the season began soon after the previous season was cancelled due to a sexual allegation.

This season takes place in the Kadavu Group in Fiji. For the first time since Koh-Lanta: Cambodge, there are three tribes. However, this time each tribe has a head chief who were chosen after winning the orientation challenge. This is also the first season to start off with more than 20 contestants.

The season concluded on 21 June 2019 where Maud Bamps won against Cindy Poumeyrol in a close 7–6 vote, becoming the first Belgian to win Koh-Lanta.

Finishing order

Future appearances
Maxime Berthon & Cindy Poumeyrol returned to compete in Koh-Lanta: La Légende.

Challenges

Voting history

Black Vote 
Alexandre to Cyril

Béatrice to Steeve

Brice to Mohamed

Angélique to Aurélien

Mohamed to Maxime

Maxime to Clo

Notes

References

External links

French reality television series
Koh-Lanta seasons
2019 French television seasons
Television shows filmed in Fiji